The Cenél nGabráin was a kingroup, presumed to descend from Gabrán mac Domangairt, which dominated the kingship of Dál Riata until the late 7th century and continued to provide kings thereafter. Kings of Alba and of Scotland traced their descent through Gabrán to his grandfather Fergus Mór, who was seen as the ultimate founder of the royal house as late as the 16th and 17th centuries, long after the Gaelic origins of the kingdom.

Unlike the Cenél Loairn, the Senchus Fer n-Alban does not list any kindreds within the Cenél nGabráin. However, probable descendants of Gabrán, such as Dúnchad mac Conaing and his many kinsmen, would appear to have disputed the succession with the descendants of Eochaid Buide grandson of Gabrán, so that this absence of explicit segments in the kindred may be misleading. A genealogy of David I of Scotland in the Book of Ballymote notes the following divisions:
 After Áedán mac Gabráin, between the main line, called "the sons of Eochaid Buide" and "the children of Cináed mac Ailpín", and the "sons of Conaing"
 After Eochaid Buide, between the main line and the "children of Fergus Goll" and the "children of Connad Cerr ... or the men of Fife", although modern studies make Connad Cerr a member of the Cenél Comgaill
 After Eochaid mac Domangairt, between the main line and the Cenél Comgaill

The domain of the Cenél nGabráin appears to have been centred in Kintyre and Knapdale and may have included Arran, Jura and Gigha. The title king of Kintyre is used of a number of presumed kings of the Cenél nGabráin. Two probable royal sites are known, Dunadd, which lies at the northern edge of their presumed lands, and Aberte (or Dún Aberte), which is very likely the later Dunaverty on the headland beside Southend, Kintyre.

Kilmartin may have been an important early Christian site by reason of its proximity to Dunadd and its dedication to Saint Martin of Tours, as may Kilmichael Glassary. However, there appears to be no religious site of the importance of Lismore in the lands of the rival Cenél Loairn.

See also 
 Origins of the Kingdom of Alba
 List of monarchs of Scotland

Notes

References 

 Adomnán of Iona, Life of Saint Columba, tr. & ed. Richard Sharpe. Penguin, London, 1995. 
 Bannerman, John, Studies in the History of Dalriada. Scottish Academic Press, Edinburgh, 1974. 
 Lane, Alan & Campbell, Ewan, Dunadd: An early Dalriadic capital, Oxbow Books, Oxford, 2000. 
 Sharpe, Richard, "The thriving of Dalriada" in Simon Taylor (ed.), Kings, clerics and chronicles in Scotland 500–1297. Four Courts, Dublin, 2000. 

Kings of Dál Riata
Medieval Gaels from Scotland
People from Knapdale